The H.E. Mahinda Rajapaksa Under-23 International Football Trophy was an association football competition of the men's national football teams of Under 23, organised by the Ministry of Sports in Sri Lanka and National Football Federation of Sri Lanka. It was only held in 2012.

Results

References

External links
 Mahinda Rajapaksa International Football Trophy
 Mahinda Rajapaksa International Football Tournament
 Mahinda Rajapaksa Trophy

  
International association football competitions hosted by Sri Lanka